Echinostoma cinetorchis is a species of human intestinal fluke, a trematode in the family Echinostomatidae.

Distribution
This species occurs in Korea.

Hosts
Hosts of Echinostoma cinetorchis include:
 Cipangopaludina chinensis (Gray, 1834) – Chinese mystery snail, an intermediate host
 Austropeplea ollula – as a first and main intermediate host
 Note on Hippeutis (Helicorbis) cantori – this species had previously been reported as first and second intermediate host, but in a subsequent study in a laboratory setting, the species was not able to be infected at all.
 Segmentina hemispaerula as a first and second intermediate host in Korea, based on laboratory work.
 Gyraulus convexiusculus as a potential first and second intermediate host in Korea, based on laboratory work.

Experimentally induced infection of host species that occur in Korea in a laboratory setting include:

From miracidia to cercaria, i.e. as a primary intermediate host:
Hippeutis sp. – experimentally induced infection
From cercaria to metacercaria, i.e. as a second intermediate host:
Hippeutis sp. – experimentally induced infection
Radix auricularia subspecies corecna – experimentally induced infection
Physella acuta, listed as Physa acuta – experimentally induced infection
 and to a very small extent, due to the mostly lethal effect of the infection,
Cipangopaludina sp. – experimentally induced infection

References

Further reading

External links
 http://www.atlas.or.kr/atlas/alphabet_view.php?my_codeName=Echinostoma%20cinetorchis

Animals described in 1923
Plagiorchiida